Fontenot is a surname of a number of American people, and may refer to:

Al Fontenot (born 1970), Chicago Bears defensive lineman
Canray Fontenot, musician
Jerry Fontenot (born 1966) football center
Herman Fontenot (born 1963) football running back
Heulette Fontenot (1961-2019) Louisiana politician and documentary film maker
Terry Fontenot (born 1980), American football scout and former player
Karl Fontenot, convicted murderer
Mary Alice Fontenot (1910–2003), children's books author
Mike Fontenot (born 1980), baseball player
Therrian Fontenot (born 1981),  Philadelphia Eagles cornerback

References

Surnames